Ysgol Tryfan is a bilingual (Welsh - English) comprehensive school for pupils aged 11–18, situated in Bangor, Gwynedd. 471 pupils were enrolled at the school in 2022.

The majority of pupils live in Bangor, with a large proportion coming from the surrounding towns and villages, including Llanfairfechan, Bethesda, Y Felinheli and Menai Bridge. The school shares the same catchment area of primary schools as Ysgol Friars. On average, around 34% of pupils from primary schools situated in Bangor transfer to Ysgol Tryfan.

Welsh is the school's administrative and official language. According to the latest Estyn inspection report carried out in 2019, 64% of pupils come from Welsh-speaking homes. As of 2015, 72% of pupils aged 11–15 were fluent in Welsh. According to the Welsh Government, Ysgol Tryfan was ranked 47th out of 207 in 2019.

Notable former pupils 

 Gwenllian Lansdown - Former Chief Executive of Plaid Cymru and current Chief Executive of Mudiad Meithrin.
 Robin McBryde - rugby international and Wales forwards coach.
 Owain Tudur Jones - footballer.
Lisa Jên - actress and singer with the Welsh language folk band 9Bach.

References

External links
 

Secondary schools in Gwynedd
1978 establishments in Wales
Educational institutions established in 1978
Bangor, Gwynedd
Tryfan